Alumni Coliseum, officially Bob Green Field at Alumni Coliseum, is a 2,000-seat college football stadium in the western United States, located on the campus of Montana Technological University  in Butte, Montana. It is the home of the NAIA Montana Tech Orediggers.

In 2013, a new artificial turf field was installed and named after legendary Montana Tech football coach Bob Green.

It is the former home of the Butte Copper Kings (now Grand Junction Rockies) Pioneer League baseball franchise. The Copper Kings shared the stadium with Montana Tech until their demise, as well as the local American Legion baseball team until a new field was built for that specific purpose. The grandstands that were used for baseball have been removed and replaced with expansions to the Montana Tech campus.

References

External links
Montana Tech Athletics – Alumni Coliseum
 Photos and Review from BallparkReviews.com

Minor league baseball venues
American football venues in Montana
Baseball venues in Montana
Buildings and structures in Butte, Montana
Tourist attractions in Butte, Montana
1962 establishments in Montana
College football venues
Sports venues completed in 1962
Defunct baseball venues in the United States
Defunct minor league baseball venues